Astia or ASTIA may refer to:

 Astia, a genus of jumping spiders
 Astia (film), Fujichrome Astia professional color reversal films by Fujifilm
 Astia Walker, (born 1975), a Jamaican runner
 Astia, new name for the Women's Technology Cluster, a women's organization in San Francisco
 The Armed Services Technical Information Agency, former name of the Defense Technical Information Center